Zakrzewo is a village in Złotów County, Greater Poland Voivodeship, in northwestern Poland. It is the seat of the gmina (administrative district) called Gmina Zakrzewo. The village has a population of 1,620.

A Blues Express festival is organized in Zakrzewo every July by the local culture centre.

History 
although Zakrzewo had a very strong and active Polish community, headed by the parson of a local parish, Bolesław Domański. According to the census of 1900, Zakrzewo had a population of 1,124, of which 78.1% were Poles. In 1935, the Nazi government changed the village's name to Buschdorf as part of a drive to Germanize Slavic-sounding placenames. For more on the history of the multi-ethnic historical area, see Złotów County.

Notable residents
Johannes Block (17 November 1894 – 26 January 1945), Wehrmacht general

References

Villages in Złotów County